Hugh Chilvers (26 October 1902 – 1 December 1994) was an Australian cricketer. He played 34 first-class matches for New South Wales between 1929/30 and 1936/37.

See also
 List of New South Wales representative cricketers

References

External links
 

1902 births
1994 deaths
Australian cricketers
New South Wales cricketers
Cricketers from Hertfordshire